Oedipus Aegyptiacus is Athanasius Kircher's supreme work of Egyptology.

The three full folio tomes of ornate illustrations and diagrams were published in Rome over the period 1652–54. Kircher cited as his sources Chaldean astrology, Hebrew kabbalah, Greek mythology, Pythagorean mathematics, Arabian alchemy and Latin philology.

Hieroglyphs

The third volume of Oedipus Aegyptiacus deals exclusively with Kircher's attempts to translate Egyptian hieroglyphs. The primary source for Kircher's study of hieroglyphs was the Bembine Tablet, so named after its acquisition by Cardinal Bembo, shortly after the sack of Rome in 1527. The Bembine Tablet is a bronze and silver tablet depicting various Egyptian gods and goddesses. In its centre sits Isis representing "the  polymorphic all-containing Universal Idea."

Kircher's Oedipus Aegyptiacus is an example of syncretic and eclectic scholarship in the late Renaissance and representative of antiquarian scholarship before the modern scientific era. His renditions of hieroglyphic texts tended to be wordy and portentous; for example, he translated a frequently occurring phrase in Egyptian, dd Wsr, "Osiris says," as "The treachery of Typhon ends at the throne of Isis, the moisture of nature is guarded by the vigilance of Anubis."

Kircher was respected in the seventeenth century for his study of Egyptian hieroglyphs; his contemporary Sir Thomas Browne (1605–1682) who owned several books by Kircher, including Oedipus Aegyptiacus, paid tribute to him as an Egyptologist and his study of hieroglyphs:
 

On the other hand, modern experts on hieroglyphic writing have found Kircher's work to be of little value.  According to E. A. Wallis Budge:

The accurate meaning of Egyptian hieroglyphs were not deciphered until 1824 when Jean-François Champollion finally solved the riddle through his study of the Rosetta stone.

In 1999 the University of Geneva exhibited one of the vast tomes of Oedipus Aegyptiacus in an exhibition to celebrate the centenary of Jorge Luis Borges as representative of books associated with the Argentinian author.

References

Sources
Athanasius Kircher: A Renaissance man in search of lost knowledge. Joscelyn Godwin pub. Thames and Hudson 1979
 Athanasius Kircher  The last man who knew everything. edi. Paula Findlen Routledge 2004

External links

A photo of the Bembine Tablet and its details
Downloadable PDf files of part of 1653 edition of the work

1652 books
Ancient Egypt in the Western imagination
Egyptology books
Athanasius Kircher
17th-century Latin books